"It's Still a Good Life" is the thirty-first episode of the 2002 revival television series  of The Twilight Zone. The episode was first broadcast on February 19, 2003, on UPN. It is a sequel to the original series episode "It's a Good Life". Bill Mumy and Cloris Leachman reprise their roles from the original episode.  Anthony Fremont's daughter, Audrey, is played by actor Bill Mumy's real life daughter Liliana Mumy. It was written by Ira Steven Behr (based on characters created by Jerome Bixby), and directed by Allan Kroeker.

Opening narration

Plot
Anthony Fremont has been terrorizing the residents of the small town of Peaksville for 40 years, still using his psychokinetic powers to banish those he deems "bad", including his own wife and father, to a mythical "cornfield". His mother Agnes is shocked to discover that Anthony's beloved young daughter Audrey has inherited those powers. This discovery is soon followed by one even more shocking: Audrey can bring back things that her father has banished to the cornfield.

With this realization, Agnes – who has grown to detest her son – tries to influence her granddaughter to use her powers in order to free Peaksville from Anthony's reign of terror. When Anthony learns of his mother's plans he seeks out each co-conspirator one by one, sending them to the cornfield. Agnes finally confronts her son, letting go of all of the dismay, hatred and anger that she has suppressed for forty years, and tries to convince Audrey to use her powers against her own father and wish Anthony away. Audrey is forced to choose between her grandmother and her father, whom she loves very much.

Caught between these two sides, Audrey ultimately aligns herself with her father, saving him from a resident who attempted to hit him while his back was turned. But then to the horror of Anthony she sends her grandmother away and empties the town of Peaksville. Anthony and Audrey are left alone, but Anthony soon realizes that he misses having everyone else around. In order to cheer her father up, Audrey brings back the world beyond Peaksville, which Anthony had sent away decades prior. Audrey asks Anthony about visiting New York City, and her father replies that it is a big city with many people. Audrey implies that they had all better be nice to her and her father, otherwise they'll suffer severe consequences.

The episode ends with Anthony realizing that his daughter is far more powerful than he is, and he accepts that she has done a "real good thing" by returning the world outside of Peaksville. As a couple pulls up to ask them if they know how to get to Highway 10, Anthony and Audrey plan to travel to different places. Anthony states that "It's going to be a good day. A real good day," as they head to the two people in the car.

Closing narration

Cast
 Anthony Fremont – Bill Mumy
 Agnes Fremont – Cloris Leachman
 Audrey Fremont – Liliana Mumy
 Lorna – Chilton Crane
 Joe – Robert Moloney
 Cynthia – Kerry Sandomirsky
 Timmy – Samuel Patrick Chu
 George – Paul McGillion
 Timmy's mother – Kirsten Kilburn

References

External links
 

2003 American television episodes
The Twilight Zone (2002 TV series) episodes
Television episodes about telekinesis
Television episodes set in Ohio